Oyster Yachts (formerly Oyster Marine) is a British brand of luxury cruising sailing yachts established in 1973. The company is based in Southampton but with foundation and ongoing strong links to Wroxham  and Ipswich.

History

Founding 
In 1973 Richard Matthews founded Oyster Marine and commissioned the 32 ft prototype three quarter tonner sailing yacht UFO II, designed by British Naval Architects Holman and Pye and built by Norfolk based boatbuilder, Landamores. She proved to be a success, with UFO winning the Royal Yacht Squadron's de Maas Cup at Cowes in 1974 alongside many other races. The design was developed into the UFO 34, and this became the first yacht to be produced by Oyster Marine.

Design 
In 1978 Oyster Marine introduced a 46 ft cruising ketch designed by Holman & Pye, pioneering the Deck Saloon feature that has since become the company's trademark. Oyster continued to increase the size of its vessels, launching a 53 ft design by Rob Humphreys in 1997 followed by a 62 ft Humphreys' design in 2002. Today, Oyster Yachts builds sailboats ranging from 56 ft to 125 ft, all designed by Rob Humphreys and the Oyster Design Team.

Ownership 
In 2008 the company was sold to private equity house Balmoral Capital in 2008 for around £70m who then sold it in 2012 to Dutch private equity firm HTP Investments BV for around £15m.

On 5 February 2018, Oyster Marine, the boat-building arm of the Oyster group (which also includes Oyster Brokerage and Oyster Charter) went into administration after a crisis in July 2015 when there was a catastrophic failure of the internal hull structure of a new Oyster 825 "Polina Star III" and the yacht sank. Despite significant positive efforts to quickly recall and repair the 4 other yachts built the same way, confidence was dented for a couple of years and incoming orders fell by 1/3rd for the next 24 months.  Following the successful launch of several new models the company closed the end of 2017 with a record orderbook of £83m but with some cash flow issues.  The Dutch shareholders made a sudden decision in January 2018 to withdraw their support and the directors had no alternative but to appoint Administrators.

KPMG was appointed as administrator to Oyster Marine Holdings (the holding company for Oyster Yachts) on 7 February 2018, and tried to find a new buyer for the business.

On 20 March 2018, gaming software entrepreneur Richard Hadida was announced as the new owner. Hadida has embarked on a mission to get the business back on its feet and to re-employ as many of the 420 previous employees of Oyster Yachts as possible. The Oyster Board consists of CEO Richard Hadida and CFO Becky Bridgen together with Non-Executives Ashley Highfield (Senior Independent Director), Eddie Jordan, Ivan Ritossa and Rob Humphreys.

Reinvestment and Growth 
Under Hadida’s ownership the company re-started manufacturing in its Wroxham yard on 15 May 2018, beginning to fulfil the contracts that Oyster held before it entered administration. This included re-hiring 50 of Oyster’s former shipwrights.

British Manufacture 
Oyster has always been a thoroughly British brand. Even during the company’s beginnings, when a lot of its boat building was subcontracted out, production was always awarded to other British yards. The most notable of these were Landamores in Hoveton (Wroxham) who were responsible for the majority of Oysters produced.

Only a couple of models in the company’s history have ever been built outside the UK. These are the 2013 Oyster 54, produced in New Zealand by McDell Marine and the 100 ft and 125 ft yachts designed by Ed Dubois built at RMK Marine in Turkey.

Oyster have moved from being a marketing company which it was for the majority of its history, to taking assembly in-house in 2000s and in 2019 it took the final step in this process taking hull moulding in-house in a partnership with Lloyds Register.

Awards and recognition 
The company has twice been awarded the Queen’s Award for Enterprise. In 2012 the Oyster 625 was named the Luxury Cruiser of the Year at the boot Düsseldorf, while the Oyster 100-01 was given the Judge's Commendation for yachts under 40 m at the World Superyacht Awards in Istanbul.

In 2016, the Oyster 675 was voted Sailing Today’s Best Luxury Cruiser, with the Oyster 565 the same award in 2017. Then, in 2018, the Oyster 745 was named Cruising World’s Boat of the Year.

Oyster Yachts was featured in the American documentary series Building the Brand in 2011, which looked at the production processes behind iconic brands. Other companies featured include Gibson Guitars and Rolls-Royce.

Oyster World Rally 
The Oyster World Rally refers to the 2-3 year worldwide sailing expeditions that Oyster Yachts organises for its owners. All owners of the company’s yachts are invited to sail the world together, following a route pre-planned and organised by Oyster and with support from the Oyster After Sales team.

The rally was initially organised to celebrate 35 years of Oyster Yachts in 2013, but with the success of the first event the company decided to make the World Rally a regular feature in the Oyster social calendar. The first rally ran from 2013-14, with one currently underway from 2017-19 and one planned for 2021-23.

Oyster is the only yachting brand currently running its own global circumnavigation.

Owner Events 
Oyster puts on regular regattas, dinners and other events for their owners, owner’s friends and family, and crew.

These events are run by the Oyster Yacht team and generally this include two regattas per year - one in the Caribbean at Easter and one in the Mediterranean in September/October - as well as parties and dinners for owners during the London, Southampton and Annapolis boat shows and other sailing events.

Models

Sailing Yachts

Current and previous Oyster yacht models are listed below, with current models in bold:

(CC = Centre Cockpit; AC = Aft Cockpit; RS = Raised Saloon; DH = Deck House) (Current Oyster Models in bold)

Sail Training Boats 
The majority of Oyster boats have been luxury cruisers, however Oyster has produced four sail training vessels:

- The Oyster 68 ketch RONA II, provided as a kit for completion by the then London Sailing Project - now Rona Sailing Project which sails out of Hamble
- The Oyster 68 ketch LORD RANK produced for the Ocean Youth Club.  LORD RANK was lost, with no loss of life, during a delivery in June 2010 when she struck and sank on the Carrickmannon Rocks off Northern Ireland.
- The Oyster 80 ketch TEAM SPIRIT OF WIGHT produced for the Ocean Youth Club and subsequently sold to Gordonstoun School as OCEAN SPIRIT OF MORAY.
- The Oyster 70 ketch ALBA VENTURER, produced for the Ocean Youth Trust Scotland.

Motor Boats

References

External links
Oyster Yachts - official website

British boat builders
Yacht building companies
Companies based in Suffolk
Manufacturing companies established in 1973
1973 establishments in England
English brands